Father Michael McGivney Catholic Academy (commonly known as FMM) is a Catholic high school of the York Catholic District School Board. It is located at the intersection of 14th Avenue and McCowan Road in the city of Markham, Ontario. The school was founded by the York Catholic District School Board in 1989 and is named in honour of Father Michael J. McGivney, founder of the Knights of Columbus. The school is authorized as an International Baccalaureate World School. The school officially opened to students in September 1992.

Students have the option of being enrolled in the International Baccalaureate program as of January 2011. This program is designed as an academically challenging and balanced program that prepares students for success in their post-secondary education and beyond. In the IB program, students study six courses at higher or standard level.  Students must choose one subject from each of groups 1 to 5 (to gain experience in languages, social studies, the experimental sciences and mathematics). Moreover, the sixth subject may be an arts subject chosen from group 6 or another subject from groups 1 to 5.

The school has an enrollment of 1400 students ranging from grade 9 to 12.

Facilities & productions

Facilities in FMM include:

 Main and attendance office
 Guidance office
 Chaplancy office
 Organic Greenhouse
 Visual art rooms
 Cafeteria
 Classrooms
 Communication/new media lab
 Building and construction shop
 Design & technological lab
 Dance studio
 Stage (in cafeteria)
 Three gymnasiums
 Music rooms
 Lecture hall (rehabilitated in 2015–2016)
 Cosmetology room
 Co-op room
 Special Education aka FLS or Best Buddies room
 Tuck shop
 Drama room
 Dome (opened 3 October 2015)
 Resource center
 Science labs
 Staff room
 Staff workrooms
 Student government office
 Student and guest parking facilities
 Washrooms for students
 Portables for ESL Adult classes
 Gymnasium change room with shower and washroom
 Weight room
 Yearbook office

Father Michael McGivney has had numerous productions for their drama classes, such as the Grade 11 production of The Big Bad in January 2011 adapted from the story of The Big Bad Wolf. In 2012 that class produced the first musical in over 4 years at the school, "You're A Good Man Charlie Brown" performed with live music. The school also has other numerous arts events, including the Grade 12 Art Exhibition at McKay House Gallery in Unionville. They had another show later that year to exhibit more photography and design work at the Unionville Station. They also host Annual Arts Night held at the school where they exhibit work by all the grades, have drama showcases, band performances and in 2012 the addition of the school's newly founded choir.

Feeder schools
Source:
 Sir Richard W. Scott Catholic School
 St. Benedict Catholic School
 St. Francis Xavier Catholic School

2003 SARS lockdown
In 2003, the entire school was quarantined and closed due to a case of the SARS virus.

Notable alumni
 Phylicia George (class of 2005), track and field athlete who competed in the 2016 Rio Olympics. Also won a bronze medal Winter Olympics at Pyeongchang 2018, in bobsleigh
 Andrew "Burd" Liburd (class of 2004), JUNO nominated music producer for Meek Mill, MGK, Pusha T, Joe Budden and others
 Jordan Romano (class of 2011), pitcher for the Toronto Blue Jays
 Mike Zigomanis (class of 2000), former professional hockey player who played for the Carolina Hurricanes, Phoenix Coyotes, St. Louis Blues, Pittsburgh Penguins, and Toronto Maple Leafs

See also
List of high schools in Ontario

References

External links

 Father Michael McGivney Catholic Academy
 Promotional video

York Catholic District School Board
High schools in the Regional Municipality of York
Catholic secondary schools in Ontario
Buildings and structures in Markham, Ontario
Educational institutions established in 1992
1992 establishments in Ontario
International Baccalaureate schools in Ontario